The Bendigo International is an international badminton tournament to be held for the first time in Bendigo, Victoria, Australia, in September 2020. The event is part of the Badminton World Federation's International Series and part of the Badminton Oceania circuit.

Past winners

Performances by nation

References 

Badminton tournaments in Australia
2020 establishments in Australia
Bendigo